Jenkins Cooper (born 15 April 1975) is a Liberian footballer. He played in 13 matches for the Liberia national football team from 1994 to 2001. He was also named in Liberia's squad for the 1996 African Cup of Nations tournament.

References

1975 births
Living people
Liberian footballers
Liberia international footballers
1996 African Cup of Nations players
Place of birth missing (living people)
Association football defenders